R. T. Greer and Company is a historic commercial building located at Marion, Smyth County, Virginia. It was built in 1916. R. T. Greer and Company was the Appalachian region's largest dealer in medicinal herbs.  They remained in business until 1968.  It is occupied by the Herb House Trading Company, Inc.

It was listed on the National Register of Historic Places in 1997.

References

External links
 Herb House Trading Company, Inc.

Commercial buildings on the National Register of Historic Places in Virginia
Commercial buildings completed in 1916
Buildings and structures in Smyth County, Virginia
National Register of Historic Places in Smyth County, Virginia
1916 establishments in Virginia